Robert Richard Fenwick (December 10, 1946), is a retired Major League Baseball player who played infielder from -. He attended Anoka High School in Minnesota then went on to play in college for University of Minnesota. He was the 16th pick in the 1st round of the 1967 June Baseball Draft by the San Francisco Giants. He played for the Houston Astros and St. Louis Cardinals. He was traded along with Ray Busse by the Astros to the Cardinals for Skip Jutze and Milt Ramírez on November 29, 1972.

References

External links

1946 births
Living people
American baseball players of Japanese descent
American expatriate baseball players in Japan
Houston Astros players
Major League Baseball infielders
Major League Baseball players from Japan
People from Naha
Sportspeople from Okinawa Prefecture
St. Louis Cardinals players
Minnesota Golden Gophers baseball players
Anoka High School alumni